Lopatinka is a rural locality (a settlement) in Yekaterininsky Selsoviet, Tretyakovsky District, Altai Krai, Russia. The population was 104 as of 2013. There is 1 street.

Geography 
Lopatinka is located 23 km southeast of Staroaleyskoye (the district's administrative centre) by road. Novokamyshenka is the nearest rural locality.

References 

Rural localities in Tretyakovsky District